Bogbrae is a hamlet in northeastern Aberdeenshire, Scotland. This location was mentioned in the geographical literature as early as 1869, observed as a locus of filling of a natural moss or bog. There is considerable evidence of vicinity habitation by early man in the area near Bogbrae. Some of these nearby human traces are evident in Catto Long Barrow, a massive stone structure now surrounded by agricultural fields.

See also
 Laeca Burn

Line notes

References
 AA Great Britain Road Atlas (2003) p. 57  
 Royal Highland and Agricultural Society of Scotland (1869) Transactions of the Highland and Agricultural Society of Scotland, published by W.Blackwood & Sons, ser.1 v.1-ser.3 v.2
 C. Michael Hogan (2008) Catto Long Barrow fieldnotes, The Modern Antiquarian

Hamlets in Scotland